Begonia conchifolia, the zip begonia, is a species of flowering plant in the family Begoniaceae. It is native to Central America; El Salvador, Costa Rica and Panama. As a houseplant it does best out of direct sunlight. 'Red Ruby' is the best known cultivar.

References

conchifolia
House plants
Flora of El Salvador
Flora of Costa Rica
Flora of Panama
Plants described in 1851